Pseudofossils are inorganic objects, markings, or impressions that might be mistaken for fossils. Pseudofossils may be misleading, as some types of mineral deposits can mimic lifeforms by forming what appear to be highly detailed or organized structures. One common example is when manganese oxides crystallize with a characteristic treelike or dendritic pattern along a rock fracture. The formation of frost dendrites on a window is another common example of this crystal growth. Concretions are sometimes thought to be fossils, and occasionally one contains a fossil, but are generally not fossils themselves. Chert or flint nodules in limestone can often take forms that resemble fossils.

Background
Pyrite disks or spindles are sometimes mistaken for fossils of sand dollars or other forms (see marcasite). Cracks, bumps, gas bubbles, and such can be difficult to distinguish from true fossils. Specimens that cannot be attributed with certainty to either fossils or pseudofossils are treated as dubiofossils. Debates on whether specific forms are pseudo or true fossils can be lengthy and difficult. For example, Eozoön is a complex laminated form of interlayered calcite and serpentine originally found in Precambrian metamorphosed limestones (marbles). It was at first thought to be the remains of a giant fossil protozoan (Dawson, 1865), then by far the oldest fossil known. Similar structures were subsequently found in metamorphosed limestone blocks ejected during an eruption of Mount Vesuvius. It was clear that high-temperature physical and chemical processes were responsible for the formation of Eozoön in the carbonate rock (O'Brien, 1970). The debate over the interpretation of Eozoon was a significant episode in the history of paleontology (Adelman, 2007).

Chemical gardens can produce branching microtubuli of 2-10 μm in diameter and can resemble very closely the shapes of fossilized primitive fungi or microorganisms. It has been proposed that ancient, precambrian, structures that have been identified as the evidence for the first fungi or even the first life, are more probably products of ancient natural chemical gardens.

References

Bibliography
 
 
 
 

Pseudofossils